Khorramabad-e Olya may refer to:
 Khorramabad-e Olya, Kermanshah
 Khorramabad-e Olya, Razavi Khorasan